The Chappell–Hadlee Trophy in cricket is a One Day International cricket series between Australia and New Zealand. It is named after legendary cricketing families from the two countries: the Chappell brothers (Ian, Gregory, and Trevor) of Australia, and Walter Hadlee and his three sons (Barry, Dayle and Sir Richard) of New Zealand.

The trophy is currently held by Australia, after they defeated New Zealand 3–0 in the 2022–23 series at home. Australia have recorded seven series wins to New Zealand's four.

The trophy was contested annually from 2004–05 until 2009–10 as a three- or five-match series, and as a one-match series during the group stage of the World Cups in 2011 and 2015. Although the 2015 Cricket World Cup Final was also contested between the same teams, that game was not considered to be a part of this trophy. The 2017–18 edition was replaced with the 2017–18 Trans-Tasman Tri-Series, but the series partially went ahead as planned in Australia in 2019–20. With only one ODI being played in 2019–20 as a result of the COVID-19 pandemic, Cricket Australia confirmed the fixtures for a rescheduled three match ODI series against New Zealand, ultimately being played in September 2022 after being postponed numerous times.

Trophy history

Chappell–Hadlee Trophy matches have seen several notable results and records broken:
New Zealand has completed three notably large run chases in Chappell–Hadlee Trophy matches. In the third ODI in 2005–06 in Christchurch, New Zealand, successfully chased Australia's total of 332, setting a new record for the highest run chase in ODI history; this record was surpassed by South Africa later in the 2005–06 season. Then, in the 2006–07 series, New Zealand successfully chased 336 in the second ODI in Auckland, and successfully chased 346 in the third ODI in Hamilton. For a time, these three matches were the second, third and fourth-highest run chases in ODI history.
In the first ODI in 2006–07 in Wellington, Australia was beaten by 10 wickets for the first time in ODI history. This was Australia's 646th ODI match.
After its loss in the second ODI in 2006–07 in Auckland, Australia lost the top spot in the ICC ODI Championship for the first time since the standings were introduced in October 2002, ending a streak of 52 consecutive months at the top.
 In the third ODI in 2006–07 in Hamilton, Matthew Hayden scored 181 not out for Australia in the first innings, setting a new record for the highest individual innings by an Australian batsman; this record stood until 2011. Craig McMillan then scored a century in 67 balls in the second innings, which (until 1 January 2014, when both Corey Anderson (off 36 balls) and Jesse Ryder (off 46 balls) broke this record in the 3rd ODI vs West Indies in Queenstown) was the fastest ever ODI century by a New Zealand batsman.

Overall statistics

Series

Matches

Series results

Series

2004–05 series in Australia

Chappell–Hadlee Trophy 2004–05. One Day International series result: Series tied 1–1.

2005–06 series in New Zealand

Chappell–Hadlee Trophy 2005–06. One Day International series result: Australia won 2–1.

2006–07 series in New Zealand

Chappell–Hadlee Trophy 2006–07. One Day International series result: New Zealand won 3–0.

2007–08 series in Australia

Chappell–Hadlee Trophy 2007–08. One Day International series result: Australia won 2–0.

2008–09 series in Australia

Chappell–Hadlee Trophy 2008–09. One Day International series result: Australia retains trophy after 2–2 draw.

2009–10 series in New Zealand

Chappell–Hadlee Trophy 2009–10. One Day International series result: Australia won 3–2.

2010–11 series in India (World Cup 2011)

The only scheduled ODI between Australia and New Zealand during the 2010–11 season was during the Group Stage of the 2011 ICC Cricket World Cup, played in Nagpur, India, on 25 February 2011, so the countries agreed to contest the Chappell–Hadlee Trophy in this match. Australia won by 7 wickets.

Chappell–Hadlee Trophy 2010–11. One Day International series result: Australia won 1–0.

2014–15 series in New Zealand (World Cup 2015)

The only scheduled ODI between Australia and New Zealand during the 2014–15 season was during the Group Stage of the 2015 ICC Cricket World Cup, played in Auckland, New Zealand, on 28 February 2015, so the countries agreed to contest the Chappell–Hadlee Trophy in this match. New Zealand won by 1 wicket.

Chappell–Hadlee Trophy 2014–15. One Day International series result: New Zealand won 1–0.

2015–16 series in New Zealand

Chappell–Hadlee Trophy 2015–16. One Day International series result: New Zealand won 2–1.

2016–17 series in Australia

Chappell–Hadlee Trophy 2016–17. One Day International series result: Australia won 3–0.

2016–17 series in New Zealand

Chappell–Hadlee Trophy 2016–17. One Day International series result: New Zealand won 2–0.

2019–20 series in Australia

Ahead of the first ODI, Cricket Australia confirmed that all matches would be played without crowd attendance, in an attempt to reduce the impact of the COVID-19 pandemic. Despite the first ODI being played, the second and third ODIs were called off on 14 March 2020, as a result of new travel restrictions being implemented in response to the coronavirus pandemic. In May 2020, Cricket Australia confirmed the fixtures for a rescheduled three match ODI series against New Zealand in January and February 2021.

Chappell–Hadlee Trophy 2019–20. One Day International series result: Australia won 1–0.

2022–23 series in Australia

Chappell–Hadlee Trophy 2022–23. One Day International series result: Australia won 3–0.

See also

Trans-Tasman Trophy
Australia–New Zealand sports rivalries

References 
  Hodge in one-day squad for New Zealand from Cricinfo
  Vettori to lead New Zealand as Fleming undergoes surgery from Cricinfo
  Cricinfo scorecard First ODI
  Cricinfo scorecard Second ODI
   New Zealand pull off record chase, from BBC Sport, published 10 December 2005
  Cricinfo scorecard Third ODI

Australia in international cricket
Australia–New Zealand sports relations
Cricket awards and rankings
Cricket rivalries
New Zealand in international cricket
One Day International cricket competitions
Sports rivalries in Australia
Sports rivalries in New Zealand
Recurring sporting events established in 2004